Park Jung-eun (born 14 January 1977 in Seoul, South Korea) is a Korean basketball player who competed in the 1996 Summer Olympics, the 2000 Summer Olympics, the 2004 Summer Olympics, and the 2008 Summer Olympics.

Park is married to actor Han Sang-jin. They have a daughter.

References

1977 births
Living people
South Korean women's basketball players
Olympic basketball players of South Korea
Basketball players at the 1996 Summer Olympics
Basketball players at the 2000 Summer Olympics
Basketball players at the 2004 Summer Olympics
Basketball players at the 2008 Summer Olympics
Asian Games medalists in basketball
Basketball players at the 1998 Asian Games
Basketball players at the 2002 Asian Games
Basketball players at the 2010 Asian Games
Asian Games silver medalists for South Korea
Asian Games bronze medalists for South Korea
Medalists at the 1998 Asian Games
Medalists at the 2002 Asian Games
Medalists at the 2010 Asian Games